Serhiy Melnichenko is a retired Soviet and Ukrainian football player.

Career
Serhiy Melnichenko started his career in 1985 with Desna Chernihiv, the main club in the city of Chernihiv for 3 seasons where he played 89 matches and scored 2 goals.  Then he moved to Khimik Chernihiv. In 9985 he moved to gidrotehnik chernigov fc and in Cheksyl Chernihiv where he stayed until 1994 playing 43 matches. In 1994 he moved to Ros Bila Tserkva where he played 12 matches. In 1994 he moved back to Cheksyl Chernihiv where he played 15 matches and also 12 matches Desna Chernihiv, scoring 1 goals. In 1995 he returned to Ros Bila Tserkva where he played 18 matches and he played also 2 matches with Domostroitel Chernihiv.

Honours
Cheksyl Chernihiv
 Chernihiv Oblast Football Championship: 1992

References

External links 
 Serhiy Melnichenko footballfacts.ru

1965 births
Living people
Footballers from Chernihiv
Soviet footballers
FC Desna Chernihiv players
FC Cheksyl Chernihiv players
FC Ros Bila Tserkva players
Ukrainian footballers
Ukrainian Second League players
Association football midfielders